The 2022–23 Delaware State Hornets men's basketball team represented Delaware State University in the 2022–23 NCAA Division I men's basketball season. The Hornets, led by second-year head coach Stan Waterman, will played their home games at Memorial Hall in Dover, Delaware as members of the Mid-Eastern Athletic Conference.

Previous season
The Hornets finished the 2021–22 season 2–25, 0–14 in MEAC play to finish in last place. As the No. 8 seed, they were defeated by top seed Norfolk State in the quarterfinals of the MEAC tournament.

Roster

Schedule and results

|-
!colspan=12 style=| Exhibition

|-
!colspan=12 style=| Regular season

|-
!colspan=9 style=| MEAC tournament

Sources

References

Delaware State Hornets men's basketball seasons
Delaware State Hornets
Delaware State Hornets men's basketball
Delaware State Hornets men's basketball